Alexander Rowan (5 October 1867–unknown) was a Scottish footballer who played in the Football League for Burton Swifts, Manchester City and The Wednesday.

References

1867 births
Date of death unknown
Scottish footballers
English Football League players
Association football forwards
Albion Rovers F.C. players
Nottingham Forest F.C. players
Sheffield Wednesday F.C. players
Burton Swifts F.C. players
Manchester City F.C. players